To Love may refer to:
To Love (1964 film), Swedish drama film written and directed by Jörn Donner
To Love (1968 film), a Soviet drama film
To Love (ja), 1997 Japanese film directed by Kei Kumai
To Love (Faye Wong album), 2003 album by Chinese singer Faye Wong
To Love (Kana Nishino album), 2010 album by Japanese singer Kana Nishino